Roberto Gabini (born June 10, 1975) is an Argentine-Italian former professional basketball player. He played for three seasons with Virtus Roma (2007-2009).

At 198 cm, he plays the small forward and power forward positions. He was born in Buenos Aires, Argentina.

Career
Gabini grew up playing with Regatas San Nicolas (Juniors) in Argentina, before making his debut with Regatas San Nicolas during the 1996-97 season, and played the 1997-98 championship with the club. Thereafter he played for Obras Sanitarias Buenos Aires, Atenas Cordoba and Boca Juniors before moving to Europe, starting with Tau Ceramica, CB Granada in Spain, Basket Rimini Crabs, Italy and Virtus Roma (2007-2009).

References

External links
 Roberto Gabini, Profile at EuroLeague
 Spanish League Profile 
 Italian League Profile 

1975 births
Living people
Argentine expatriate basketball people in Spain
Argentine men's basketball players
Atenas basketball players
Basket Rimini Crabs players
Belgrano de San Nicolás basketball players
Boca Juniors basketball players
CB Granada players
Gimnasia y Esgrima de Comodoro Rivadavia basketball players
Libertad de Sunchales basketball players
Italian expatriate basketball people in Spain
Italian men's basketball players
Liga ACB players
Nuova AMG Sebastiani Basket Rieti players
Obras Sanitarias basketball players
Pallacanestro Virtus Roma players
Power forwards (basketball)
Saski Baskonia players
Small forwards
Basketball players from Buenos Aires